This is a list of international prime ministerial trips made by Recep Tayyip Erdoğan, the 25th Prime Minister of Turkey, after he assumed the premiership on March 14, 2014 and until he became the 12th President of Turkey on August 28, 2014. The summary does not include trips made after becoming the President.

Erdogan has made 301 international trips to 91 countries during the course of his premiership. He has made the largest number of trips to Germany. The second most visited country is the United States due to attendance of meetings of the United Nations and other international organizations. The third most visited country is Belgium, due to issues concerning the accession of Turkey to the European Union. The fourth most visited country by Erdoğan is the neighbouring Azerbaijan.

Summary of international trips

Total: 301 international trips to 91 countries.

2002

Erdogan won the elections of November 2002, but was obstructed to become prime minister until the by-election in March 2003. Although, Erdogan was not the Prime Minister during that period, he still served as the de facto leader of Turkey. During this period, his visits were done in the framework of accession of Turkey to the European Union

2003

As Prime Minister:

2004

2005

2006

2007

2008

2009

2010

2011

2012

2013

2014

See also

List of international presidential trips made by Recep Tayyip Erdoğan
Foreign policy of the Recep Tayyip Erdoğan government

References

Recep Tayyip Erdoğan
State visits by Turkish leaders
Trips
Erdogan, Recep Tayyip